Augusto Benedico (December 20, 1909 – January 19, 1992), born Augusto Pérez Lias, was a Mexican actor of Spanish origin best known for his role as "Don Alberto Salvatierra" in the soap opera Los ricos también lloran and his role as "Don Fernando" in the American educational television program Destinos: An Introduction to Spanish.

Selected filmography

 La venenosa (1949) - El tigre
 Capitán de rurales (1951) - Doctor (uncredited)
 They Say I'm a Communist (1951) - Don Federico, jefe de Benito (uncredited)
 Doña Perfecta (1951) - Don Anselmo (uncredited)
 Aquellos ojos verdes (1952) - Guillermo (uncredited)
 Prisionera del recuerdo (1952) - Sr. Villalba
 Casa de muñecas (1954) - Agustín Arreola
 El gran autor (1954) - Don Sergio
 La rival (1955)
 Después de la tormenta (1955)
 Historia de un amor (1956) - Especialista médico (uncredited)
 Con quién andan nuestras hijas (1956) - Padre de Beatriz
 La Ilegítima (1956) - Don Alfonso (uncredited)
 Esposas infieles (1956)
 Juventud desenfrenada (1956) - Jefe del Tribunal
 Tinieblas (1957) - Licenciado Gómez
 Concurso de belleza (1958)
 Ama a tu prójimo (1958) - Empresario
 El hombre que logró ser invisible (1958) - Luis / Lewis hall
 Sabrás que te quiero (1958) - Luis Mendoza
 Kermesse (1959) - Don Jose Gómez
 Siete pecados (1959) - Eduardo del Campo
 Manicomio (1959) - Dr. Gustavo Ortiz, señor director
 Nacida para amar (1959)
 La Fièvre Monte à El Pao (1959) - Le ministre Sáenz (uncredited)
 Yo pecador (1959) - Doctor
 La cigüeña dijo sí (1960)
 Mundo, demonio y carne (1960)
 The White Sister (1960) - Monseñor
 Dios sabrá juzgarnos (1961)
 Confidencias matrimoniales (1961)
 Espiritismo (1962) - Sacerdote
 Las recién casadas (1962) - Sacerdote
 The Exterminating Angel (1962) - Carlos Conde
 Los secretos del sexo débil (1962)
 Estos años violentos (1962) - Dr. Sáenz
 Cascabelito (1962)
 Santo vs. las Mujeres Vampiro (1962) - Prof. Orlof
 El cielo y la tierra (1962) - Doctor
 Santo contra el rey del crimen (1962) - Matias
 Santo en el hotel de la muerte (1963) - Matias
 Santo contra el cerebro diabolico (1963) - 
 Mi vida es una canción (1963)
 Amor y sexo (1964) - Carlos
 Napoleoncito (1964) - Director del banco
 La mano que aprieta (1966) - Julio Arena (uncredited)
 Sólo para tí (1966) - Ricardo
 Pedro Páramo (1967) - Padre Rentería
 Las amiguitas de los ricos (1967) - Raimundo
 Le Rapace (1968) - Maitre Calvez
 Cuatro hombres marcados (1968)
 The Big Cube (1969) - Dr. Lorenz
 La puerta y la mujer del carnicero (1969) - Invitado (segment "La puerta")
 El último pistolero (1969)
 Remolino de pasiones (1970) - Alfonso Solorzano
 El pueblo del terror (1970) - Don Lucas Muñoz
 La hora desnuda (1971)
 El cielo y tu (1971) - Monseñor
 Yesenia (1971)
 Sin salida (1971) - Doctor
 Secreto de confesión (1971) - Don Ignacio Roldán
 The Garden of Aunt Isabel (1972)
 Nadie te querrá como yo (1972) - Anibal Carrasco
 El festin de la loba (1972) - Don Rubén
 Los Cachorros (1973) - Sr. Cuéllar
 El imponente (1973)
 El monasterio de los buitres (1973)
 Jalisco nunca pierde (1974) - Don Cenen Palomares
 Sandakot na bala (1988)

External links

1909 births
1992 deaths
Mexican male telenovela actors
Spanish emigrants to Mexico
People from Alicante
Mexican male television actors
Mexican male stage actors
20th-century Mexican male actors